The Ponte di Quintodecimo is a Roman stone bridge over the river Tronto next to the village of Quintodecimo, Marche, central Italy.

The bridge consists of a main arch spanning the river and 2 smaller arches connecting the road to the bridge. The main arch has a span of ca 17 m. The width of the bridge is about 3.8 m. The original construction material was Travertine. During Roman times the bridge was a part of the Via Salaria, which led from Rome to the Adriatic coast.

See also 
 List of Roman bridges
 Roman architecture
 Roman engineering

Sources 
 
 Cortright, Robert S. (1998), Bridging: Discovering the Beauty of Bridges, Bridge Ink, p. 111,

External links 
 
 

Roman bridges in Italy
Deck arch bridges
Stone bridges in Italy
Buildings and structures in le Marche
Transport in le Marche